Blindead is a Polish progressive extreme metal band from Gdynia, formed in 1999 under the name Incorrect Personality.

In 2011, the band was nominated for a Fryderyk Award in the category 'Album of the Year – Heavy Metal'.

Band members
 Current members
 Mateusz Śmierzchalski – guitars (1999–present)
 Konrad Ciesielski – drums (1999–present)
 Bartosz Hervy – keyboards (2007–present)
 Matteo Bassoli – bass (2012–present)

 Former members 
 Michał Zimorski –  bass (1999–2004)
 Marek Zieliński – guitars (1999–2018)
 Rafał Brauer – bass (2004–2006)
 Piotr Kawalerowski – bass (2006–2012)
 Patryk Adamczyk – vocals (1999–2002)
 Patryk Zwoliński – vocals (2002–2015)
 Jan Galbas – vocals, guitars (2015)
 Piotr Pieza – vocals (2016-2018)

Timeline

Discography

Studio albums

Extended plays

Music videos

References

External links

 Blindead on Myspace

1999 establishments in Poland
Musical groups established in 1999
Musical quartets
Mystic Production artists
Polish progressive metal musical groups
Sludge metal musical groups